This is a list of flags that were used by and in Yugoslavia.

National and civil flags

Proposed flags

Military flags

Army flags

Naval ensigns

Naval jacks

Defence Ministry Flags

Rank flags

Government flags

Governmental

Monarchical

Republic flags

Socialist Republic of Bosnia and Herzegovina

Proposed flags

Socialist Republic of Croatia

Socialist Republic of Macedonia

Socialist Republic of Montenegro

Socialist Republic of Serbia

Socialist Republic of Slovenia

Banate flags

Ethnic communities
Although the Socialist Autonomous Province of Kosovo had no official flag, from 1969 the Kosovar Albanian population was able to use a variant of the Albanian flag as its ethnic flag. As of 1985 a similar right applied to all national minorities, provided the flag was charged with the Yugoslav red star.

References

External links
 Flags of Yugoslavia (at Flags & Arms of the Modern Era)

Flags of Yugoslavia
Yugoslavia
Yugoslavia
Yugoslavia
Flags